Berzini Parish is an administrative unit of Krāslava Municipality in the Latgale region of Latvia.

Towns, villages and settlements of Bērziņi parish

References 

Parishes of Latvia
Krāslava Municipality
Latgale